Hanasaari Power Plant (also referred as Hanasaari B power plant to distinguish from the dismantled power plant located at the same site) is a coal-fired cogeneration power plant in Sörnäinen, Helsinki, Finland.

History
The first power plant in Hanasaari area, the Suvilahti steam power plant, was built in 1909. It stayed in operation until commissioning the existing Hanasaari power plant. Its facility is classified as an architecturally and historically significant building.

The Hanasaari A power plant was built in 1960–1967. The Hanasaari B power plant, built next to Hanasaari A, was commissioned in 1974.  Hanasaari A was decommissioned in 2000 and dismantled in 2008.  The coal store to be moved to the silos to be built next to the Hanasaari B as the southern part of the site will be restored for residential use.  The residential area, named 'Tropaion', is designed by the Finnish architect bureau ALA.  There is an experimental documentary Hanasaari A by Hannes Vartiainen and Pekka Veikkolainen.

Description
Hanasaari B is a coal-fired cogeneration plant producing electricity and heat. It is equipped with two furnaces.

A separate peak-load and reserve heating plant is being built in front of the power plant.  In 2014–2018, Helsingin Energia plans to modernize the Hanasaari power plants for combustion of biomass (wood).  The biomass furnace would be set up alongside one of the existing coal units, which would be kept in reserve in case of emergency.  The plant will be decommissioned by 2025.

See also

Energy in Finland
List of tallest structures in Finland

References

External links
 Hanasaari power plant (Helen website)

Coal-fired power stations in Finland
Buildings and structures in Helsinki
Helen Oy
Sörnäinen